Harpalus michaili is a species of ground beetle in the subfamily Harpalinae. It was described by Kataev in 1990.

References

michaili
Beetles described in 1990